A kitchen is a room or part of a room used for cooking and food preparation in a dwelling or in a commercial establishment. A modern middle-class residential kitchen is typically equipped with a stove, a sink with hot and cold running water, a refrigerator, and worktops and kitchen cabinets arranged according to a modular design. Many households have a microwave oven, a dishwasher, and other electric appliances. The main functions of a kitchen are to store, prepare and cook food (and to complete related tasks such as dishwashing). The room or area may also be used for dining (or small meals such as breakfast), entertaining and laundry. The design and construction of kitchens is a huge market all over the world.

Commercial kitchens are found in restaurants, cafeterias, hotels, hospitals, educational and workplace facilities, army barracks, and similar establishments. These kitchens are generally larger and equipped with bigger and more heavy-duty equipment than a residential kitchen. For example, a large restaurant may have a huge walk-in refrigerator and a large commercial dishwasher machine. In some instances, commercial kitchen equipment such as commercial sinks is used in household settings as it offers ease of use for food preparation and high durability.

In developed countries, commercial kitchens are generally subject to public health laws. They are inspected periodically by public-health officials, and forced to close if they do not meet hygienic requirements mandated by law.

History

Middle Ages

Early medieval European longhouses had an open fire under the highest point of the building. The "kitchen area" was between the entrance and the fireplace. In wealthy homes, there was typically more than one kitchen. In some homes, there were upwards of three kitchens. The kitchens were divided based on the types of food prepared in them.

The kitchen might be separate from the great hall due to the smoke from cooking fires and the chance the fires may get out of control. Few medieval kitchens survive as they were "notoriously ephemeral structures".

Colonial America
In Connecticut, as in other colonies of New England during Colonial America, kitchens were often built as separate rooms and were located behind the parlor and keeping room or dining room. One early record of a kitchen is found in the 1648 inventory of the estate of a John Porter of Windsor, Connecticut. The inventory lists goods in the house "over the kittchin" and "in the kittchin". The items listed in the kitchen were: silver spoons, pewter, brass, iron, arms, ammunition, hemp, flax and "other implements about the room".

Rationalization
A stepping stone to the modern fitted kitchen was the Frankfurt Kitchen, designed by Margarethe Schütte-Lihotzky for social housing projects in 1926. This kitchen measured , and was built to optimize kitchen efficiency and lower building costs. The design was the result of detailed time-motion studies and interviews with future tenants to identify what they needed from their kitchens. Schütte-Lihotzky's fitted kitchen was built in some 10,000 apartments in housing projects erected in Frankfurt in the 1930s.

Materials
The Frankfurt Kitchen of 1926 was made of several materials depending on the application. The modern built-in kitchens of today use particle boards or MDF, decorated with a variety of materials and finishes including wood veneers, lacquer, glass, melamine, laminate, ceramic and eco gloss. Very few manufacturers produce home built-in kitchens from stainless steel. Until the 1950s, steel kitchens were used by architects, but this material was displaced by the cheaper particle board panels sometimes decorated with a steel surface.

Domestic kitchen planning

Domestic (or residential) kitchen design is a relatively recent discipline. The first ideas to optimize the work in the kitchen go back to Catharine Beecher's A Treatise on Domestic Economy (1843, revised and republished together with her sister Harriet Beecher Stowe as The American Woman's Home in 1869). Beecher's "model kitchen" propagated for the first time a systematic design based on early ergonomics. The design included regular shelves on the walls, ample workspace, and dedicated storage areas for various food items. Beecher even separated the functions of preparing food and cooking it altogether by moving the stove into a compartment adjacent to the kitchen.

Christine Frederick published from 1913 a series of articles on "New Household Management" in which she analyzed the kitchen following Taylorist principles of efficiency, presented detailed time-motion studies, and derived a kitchen design from them. Her ideas were taken up in the 1920s by architects in Germany and Austria, most notably Bruno Taut, Erna Meyer, Margarete Schütte-Lihotzky and Benita Otte, who designed the first fitted kitchen for the Haus am Horn, which was completed in 1923. Similar design principles were employed by Schütte-Lihotzky for her famous Frankfurt kitchen, designed for Ernst May's Römerstadt, a social housing project in Frankfurt, in 1927.

While this "work kitchen" and variants derived from it were a great success for tenement buildings, homeowners had different demands and did not want to be constrained by a  kitchen. Nevertheless, the kitchen design was mostly ad-hoc following the whims of the architect. In the U.S., the "Small Homes Council", since 1993 the "Building Research Council", of the School of Architecture of the University of Illinois at Urbana–Champaign was founded in 1944 with the goal to improve the state of the art in home building, originally with an emphasis on standardization for cost reduction. It was there that the notion of the kitchen work triangle was formalized: the three main functions in a kitchen are storage, preparation, and cooking (which Catharine Beecher had already recognized), and the places for these functions should be arranged in the kitchen in such a way that work at one place does not interfere with work at another place, the distance between these places is not unnecessarily large, and no obstacles are in the way. A natural arrangement is a triangle, with the refrigerator, the sink, and the stove at a vertex each.

This observation led to a few common kitchen forms, commonly characterized by the arrangement of the kitchen cabinets and sink, stove, and refrigerator:
 A single-file kitchen (also known as a one-way galley or a straight-line kitchen) has all of these along one wall; the work triangle degenerates to a line. This is not optimal, but often the only solution if space is restricted. This may be common in an attic space that is being converted into a living space, or a studio apartment.
 The double-file kitchen (or two-way galley) has two rows of cabinets on opposite walls, one containing the stove and the sink, the other the refrigerator. This is the classical work kitchen and makes efficient use of space.
 In the L-kitchen, the cabinets occupy two adjacent walls. Again, the work triangle is preserved, and there may even be space for an additional table at a third wall, provided it does not intersect the triangle.
 A U-kitchen has cabinets along three walls, typically with the sink at the base of the "U". This is a typical work kitchen, too, unless the two other cabinet rows are short enough to place a table on the fourth wall.
 A G-kitchen has cabinets along three walls, like the U-kitchen, and also a partial fourth wall, often with a double basin sink at the corner of the G shape. The G-kitchen provides additional work and storage space and can support two work triangles. A modified version of the G-kitchen is the double-L, which splits the G into two L-shaped components, essentially adding a smaller L-shaped island or peninsula to the L-kitchen.

 The block kitchen (or island) is a more recent development, typically found in open kitchens. Here, the stove or both the stove and the sink are placed where an L or U kitchen would have a table, in a free-standing "island", separated from the other cabinets. In a closed room, this does not make much sense, but in an open kitchen, it makes the stove accessible from all sides such that two persons can cook together, and allows for contact with guests or the rest of the family since the cook does not face the wall any more. Additionally, the kitchen island's counter-top can function as an overflow surface for serving buffet-style meals or sitting down to eat breakfast and snacks.

In the 1980s, there was a backlash against industrial kitchen planning and cabinets with people installing a mix of work surfaces and free standing furniture, led by kitchen designer Johnny Grey and his concept of the "unfitted kitchen". Modern kitchens often have enough informal space to allow for people to eat in it without having to use the formal dining room. Such areas are called "breakfast areas", "breakfast nooks" or "breakfast bars" if space is integrated into a kitchen counter. Kitchens with enough space to eat in are sometimes called "eat-in kitchens". During the 2000s, flat pack kitchens were popular for people doing DIY renovating on a budget. The flat pack kitchens industry makes it easy to put together and mix and matching doors, bench tops and cabinets. In flat pack systems, many components can be interchanged.

In larger homes, where the owners might have meals prepared by a household staff member, the home may have a chef's kitchen. This typically differs from a normal domestic kitchen by having multiple ovens (possibly of different kinds for different kinds of cooking), multiple sinks, and warming drawers to keep food heated between cooking and service.

Other types

Restaurant and canteen kitchens found in hotels, hospitals, educational and workplace facilities, army barracks, and similar institutions are generally (in developed countries) subject to public health laws. They are inspected periodically by public health officials and forced to close if they do not meet hygienic requirements mandated by law.

Canteen kitchens (and castle kitchens) were often the places where new technology was used first. For instance, Benjamin Thompson's "energy saving stove", an early 19th-century fully closed iron stove using one fire to heat several pots, was designed for large kitchens; another thirty years passed before they were adapted for domestic use.

As of 2017, restaurant kitchens usually have tiled walls and floors and use stainless steel for other surfaces (workbench, but also door and drawer fronts) because these materials are durable and easy to clean. Professional kitchens are often equipped with gas stoves, as these allow cooks to regulate the heat more quickly and more finely than electrical stoves. Some special appliances are typical for professional kitchens, such as large installed deep fryers, steamers, or a bain-marie.

The fast food and convenience food trends have changed the manner in which restaurant kitchens operate. Some of these type restaurants may only "finish" convenience food that is delivered to them or just reheat completely prepared meals. At the most they may grill a hamburger or a steak. But in the early 21st century, c-stores (convenience stores) are attracting greater market share by performing more food preparation on-site and better customer service than some fast food outlets.

The kitchens in railway dining cars have presented special challenges: space is limited, and, personnel must be able to serve a great number of meals quickly. Especially in the early history of railways, this required flawless organization of processes; in modern times, the microwave oven and prepared meals have made this task much easier. Kitchens aboard ships, aircraft and sometimes railcars are often referred to as galleys. On yachts, galleys are often cramped, with one or two burners fueled by an LP gas bottle. Kitchens on cruise ships or large warships, by contrast, are comparable in every respect with restaurants or canteen kitchens.

On passenger airliners, the kitchen is reduced to a pantry.  The crew's role is to heat and serve in-flight meals delivered by a catering company. An extreme form of the kitchen occurs in space, e.g., aboard a Space Shuttle (where it is also called the "galley") or the International Space Station. The astronauts' food is generally completely prepared, dehydrated, and sealed in plastic pouches before the flight. The kitchen is reduced to a rehydration and heating module.

Outdoor areas where food is prepared are generally not considered kitchens, even though an outdoor area set up for regular food preparation, for instance when camping, might be referred to as an "outdoor kitchen". An outdoor kitchen at a campsite might be placed near a well, water pump, or water tap, and it might provide tables for food preparation and cooking (using portable camp stoves). Some campsite kitchen areas have a large tank of propane connected to burners so that campers can cook their meals. Military camps and similar temporary settlements of nomads may have dedicated kitchen tents, which have a vent to enable cooking smoke to escape.

In schools where home economics, food technology (previously known as "domestic science"), or culinary arts are taught, there are typically a series of kitchens with multiple equipment (similar in some respects to laboratories) solely for the purpose of teaching. These consist of multiple workstations, each with its own oven, sink, and kitchen utensils, where the teacher can show students how to prepare food and cook it.

By region

China

Kitchens in China are called . More than 3000 years ago, the ancient Chinese used the ding for cooking food.  The ding was developed into the wok and pot used today. In Chinese spiritual tradition, a Kitchen God watches over the kitchen for the family and reports to the Jade Emperor annually about the family's behavior. On Chinese New Year's Eve, families would gather to pray for the kitchen god to give a good report to heaven and wish him to bring back good news on the fifth day of the New Year. 
  
The most common cooking equipment in Chinese family kitchens and restaurant kitchens are woks, steamer baskets and pots. The fuel or heating resource was also an important technique to practice the cooking skills. Traditionally  Chinese were using wood or straw as the fuel to cook food. A Chinese chef had to master flaming and heat radiation to reliably prepare traditional recipes. Chinese cooking will use a pot or wok for pan-frying, stir-frying, deep frying or boiling.

Japan

Kitchens in Japan are called Daidokoro (台所; lit. "kitchen"). Daidokoro is the place where food is prepared in a Japanese house. Until the Meiji era, a kitchen was also called kamado (かまど; lit. stove) and there are many sayings in the Japanese language that involve kamado as it was considered the symbol of a house and the term could even be used to mean "family" or "household" (similar to the English word "hearth"). When separating a family, it was called Kamado wo wakeru, which means "divide the stove". Kamado wo yaburu (lit. "break the stove") means that the family was bankrupt.

India

In India, a kitchen is called a "Rasoi" (in Hindi\Sanskrit)  or a "Swayampak ghar" in Marathi, and there exist many other names for it in the various regional languages. Many different methods of cooking exist across the country, and the structure and the materials used in constructing kitchens have varied depending on the region. For example, in the north and central India, cooking used to be carried out in clay ovens called "chulha" (also chullha or chullah), fired by wood, coal or dried cow dung. In households where members observed vegetarianism, separate kitchens were maintained to cook and store vegetarian and non-vegetarian food. Religious families often treat the kitchen as a sacred space. Indian kitchens are built on an Indian architectural science called vastushastra. The Indian kitchen vastu is of utmost importance while designing kitchens in India. Modern-day architects also follow the norms of vastushastra while designing Indian kitchens across the world.

While many kitchens belonging to poor families continue to use clay stoves and the older forms of fuel, the urban middle and upper classes usually have gas stoves with cylinders or piped gas attached. Electric cooktops are rarer since they consume a great deal of electricity, but microwave ovens are gaining popularity in urban households and commercial enterprises. Indian kitchens are also supported by biogas and solar energy as fuel. World's largest solar energy kitchen is built in India. In association with government bodies, India is encouraging domestic biogas plants to support the kitchen system.

See also

 Cooking techniques
 Cuisine
 Dirty kitchen
 Hearth
 Hoosier cabinet
 Kitchen utensil
 Kitchen ventilation
 Universal design

References

Further reading
 Beecher, C. E. and Beecher Stowe, H.: The American Woman's Home, 1869. The American Woman's Home
 Cahill, Nicolas. Household and City Organization at Olynthus 
 Cromley, Elizabeth Collins. The Food Axis: Cooking, Eating, and the Architecture of American Houses (University of Virginia Press; 2011);  288 pages; Explores the history of American houses through a focus on spaces for food preparation, cooking, consumption, and disposal.
 Harrison, M.: The Kitchen in History, Osprey; 1972; 
 Kinchin, Juliet and Aidan O'Connor, Counter Space: Design and the Modern Kitchen (MoMA: New York, 2011)
 Lupton, E. and Miller, J. A.: The Bathroom, the Kitchen, and the Aesthetics of Waste, Princeton Architectural Press; 1996; . The Bathroom, the Kitchen and the Aesthetics of Waste
 Snodgrass, M. E.: Encyclopedia of Kitchen History; Fitzroy Dearborn Publishers; (November 2004);

External links

Photo History of the Kitchen 1860–1960

 
Rooms
Food and drink preparation
Restaurant terminology